Davor Rogač (born 29 March 1988) is a Croatian professional footballer who plays as a centre back for SK Fürstenfeld in Austria.

Club career
Originally from Supetar on the island of Brač, Rogač started training football at the local  before moving to Zagreb with his parents, initially joining NK Hrvatski Dragovoljac and subsequently moving through the ranks of GNK Dinamo Zagreb, becoming a youth international in the process.

Not signing a professional contract with the club, he played four seasons with NK Lučko, achieving promotion to Prva HNL in 2011, followed by an immediate relegation after. In 2013 he moved on to NK Inter Zaprešić, also playing in Druga HNL, but returned to Lučko for the subsequent season. In 2015, he moved abroad, to Zavrč in Slovenia, staying a season playing at the club in the local top tier, before it was relegated.

After a season-long hiatus, Rogač joined Ethnikos Achna FC on Cyprus for the 2017-2018 season. On 7 August 2019, Rogač returned to NK Lučko. In February 2020, Rogač joined Austrian club TUS Bad Waltersdorf. However, due to the cancellation of all football in Austria because of the COVID-19 pandemic, he only played a few unofficial games for the club, before returning to Croatia in August 2020, where he joined NK Bratstvo Kunovec. He left the club in July 2021 and then joined SK Fürstenfeld.

International career
Rogač represented Croatia on U–16 and U–17       levels in 2006.

References

External links

1988 births
Living people
People from Supetar
Association football central defenders
Croatian footballers
Croatia youth international footballers
NK Lučko players
NK Inter Zaprešić players
NK Zavrč players
ENTHOI Lakatamia FC players
Ethnikos Achna FC players
Croatian Football League players
First Football League (Croatia) players
Slovenian PrvaLiga players
Cypriot First Division players
Cypriot Second Division players
Austrian Landesliga players
Croatian expatriate footballers
Croatian expatriate sportspeople in Slovenia
Croatian expatriate sportspeople in Cyprus
Croatian expatriate sportspeople in Austria
Expatriate footballers in Slovenia
Expatriate footballers in Cyprus
Expatriate footballers in Austria